Steve David Macleod Brown  is director of the Medical Research Council (MRC) Mammalian Genetics Unit, MRC Harwell at Harwell Science and Innovation Campus, Oxfordshire, a research centre on mouse genetics. In addition, he leads the Genetics and Pathobiology of Deafness research group.

Education 
Brown was educated at Belfast Royal Academy and St Catharine's College, Cambridge, where he was awarded a Bachelor of Arts degree in 1977 followed by a PhD in 1981 for research on the molecular organisation and evolution of rodent genomes supervised by Gabriel Dover.

Career and research
Brown conducts research in mouse genetics and genomics. He has studied repeated sequences in the DNA of mice and produced molecular maps of mouse chromosomes, which were used to sequence the mouse genome. He subsequently pioneered efforts to functionally annotate the mouse genome and identify and generate novel disease models through mutagenesis and phenotyping. In particular, he has identified key proteins involved in hearing, contributing to the understanding of the genetics of deafness. For example, research in Brown's laboratory has shown that a mutation in the Evi1 gene increases susceptibility to inflammation of the middle ear (otitis media) in mice, leading to hearing loss.

A particular focus has been the use of mouse models to elucidate the molecular basis of genetic deafness. With Karen Steel, he discovered myosin VIIA as the gene underlying the shaker-1 mutant – one of the first deafness genes to be identified.

Prior to being appointed director of Harwell in 1998, Brown was a professor at Imperial College London. He is chair of the International Mouse Phenotyping Consortium steering committee and joint editor-in-chief of the journal Mammalian Genome.

Awards and honours 
Brown was awarded The Genetics Society Medal in 2009, elected a Fellow of the Academy of Medical Sciences in 2001, and elected a Fellow of the Royal Society (FRS) in 2015. His certificate of election reads:

References 

Living people
Fellows of the Royal Society
Fellows of the Academy of Medical Sciences (United Kingdom)
British geneticists
Alumni of St Catharine's College, Cambridge
Academics of Imperial College London
Medical Research Council (United Kingdom) people
1955 births